is a retired Japanese sprinter who specialized in the 100 metres.

He won the bronze medal at the 2009 Summer Universiade and a gold medal in relay at the 2009 Asian Championships. At the 2009 World Championships, he finished fourth in the relay. He also competed in the 100 metres. He reached the semi-final at the 2010 World Indoor Championships.

His personal best times are 6.75 seconds in the 60 metres (indoor), achieved at the 2010 World Indoor Championships in Doha; 10.07 seconds in the 100 metres, achieved in June 2009 in Hiroshima; and 20.88 seconds in the 200 metres, achieved in October 2008 in Ōita.

He retired in 2018.

Personal bests

Records
4 × 200 m relay
Former Japanese and Japanese university record holder - 1:22.67 s (relay leg: 1st) (Yokohama, 27 September 2008)

 with Yukio Yanai, Hiroshi Kihara, and Shintarō Kimura

Competition record

National Championship

References

External links
 
 
 Masashi Eriguchi profile at JAAF 
 
 

1988 births
Living people
Japanese male sprinters
Olympic male sprinters
Olympic athletes of Japan
Athletes (track and field) at the 2012 Summer Olympics
Asian Games competitors for Japan
Athletes (track and field) at the 2010 Asian Games
Universiade medalists in athletics (track and field)
Universiade bronze medalists for Japan
Medalists at the 2009 Summer Universiade
World Athletics Championships athletes for Japan
Japan Championships in Athletics winners
21st-century Japanese people